The Schapfen-Mill-Tower is a  tall silo tower near Ulm, Germany. Schapfen-Mill-Tower started construction in 2004 and was completed in 2005. It was the tallest operational grain elevator for a time following the demolition of Henninger Turm in 2013, but was surpassed in 2016 with the completion of the Swissmill Tower in Zürich, Switzerland.

Inside the tower are 30 cells inside which about 8,000 metric tons of grain can be stored. The intake capacity is 120 tonnes per hour. The facade on the south side is equipped with a photovoltaic system consisting of 1300 CIS solar modules, which produces about 70,000 kWh of electricity annually. However, due to the vertical mounting, the plant yields only about 70 percent of the theoretically possible yield.

References

External links 
 
 
 Official Website

Towers in Germany
Buildings and structures in Baden-Württemberg